Father Mario Falconi was honored for his humanitarian acts in defense of Tutsis during the genocide in eastern Rwanda. He refused to leave Rwanda during the genocide and saved 3,000 people from being massacred.

References

Living people
21st-century Italian Roman Catholic priests
Year of birth missing (living people)
People of the Rwandan genocide
20th-century Italian Roman Catholic priests